John Murray Island, Danish John Murray Ø, is an uninhabited island in the far north of Greenland, in the Northeast Greenland National Park area.

Geography
John Murray Island is located off the mouth of J.P. Koch Fjord in the Lincoln Sea, to the west of Sverdrup Island and to the north of Nares Land. The island has an area of 120.9 km ² and a shoreline of 43.1 kilometres. Beaumont Island lies 20 km to the west of the western end of the island.

Illustrations

See also
List of islands of Greenland

References

Uninhabited islands of Greenland